Special Agent Oso  is an American computer-animated children's television series. The series was created by Ford Riley. It premiered on April 4, 2009 with 2 episodes airing that day as part of Disney Channel's Playhouse Disney block, and aired two seasons of 60 episodes through May 17, 2012. After the original broadcast of the series finale on May 17, 2012, reruns continued to air until December 25, 2016. The series was made available on Disney+ on May 14, 2021.

Premise
Each episode begins with Special Agent Oso in the midst of a training exercise, which he usually fails on his first try, causing him to say "It's all part of the plan more or less." Paw Pilot, his computerized assistant, alerts him by saying "Special Alert, Special Alert." Invariably, during the exercise, at least one child is confronted with a simple task which they have trouble completing, an event which a Shutterbug drone notices. Oso is always assigned to the case, and Paw Pilot, along with the seen unseen Mr. Dos, illustrates his client's plight and assigns him a mission to help the child complete the task. To do so, Paw Pilot provides Oso with "three special steps," a simplified step-by-step guide to completing the task. Oso is transported to the child's location and attempts to follow the steps as the steps, in and of themselves, are usually too vague to complete the task properly. Paw Pilot also gives further elaborations, including at least one helpful trick. On the third and final step, Paw Pilot senses the time limit on the task between 3 and 19 seconds and begins counting down when the time limit is near. Oso and the child usually complete the task, just as the time runs out.

Returning from the assignment, the helpful trick given during the assignment always turns out to be the same trick Oso needed to complete the interrupted training exercise, which he likewise completes and passes, getting a "digi-medal," a digital award, for both the training exercise and the special assignment.

Episodes

The show has 60 episodes; 24 in the first season and 36 in the second. The episode names are usually references to the names of the James Bond films from Eon Productions, such as The World Is Not Enough and The Man with the Golden Gun but not a parody of them. Across its run, Special Agent Oso had at least one episode title that referenced each of the then-22 Bond films (Skyfall was still in development at the time the show concluded). Some episode titles also reference the Carly Simon song Nobody Does It Better, theme song to The Spy Who Loved Me. One episode references the non-Eon film Never Say Never Again. One episode also spoofs Another Way to Die, which is the theme song to Quantum of Solace.

Components
Each episode is composed of four components:
 The Three Special Steps are the steps that Paw Pilot gives Oso to follow when he is on his special assignments. Oso has a matter of time to finish the three special steps. The third step is usually timed between 3 and 19 seconds.
 The training exercises are Oso's training task assigned by Wolfie, Dotty or Buffo. Oso usually fails on his first try, but in the course of doing the special assignments, he refers to the mistake he made in his training exercise, thanks to the person he is helping. He then returns to his training exercise and does it right on his second try, then earns a "Digi-Medal".
 The special assignments are missions that Oso is requested to complete by the mysterious Mr. Dos, in order to help a child in need. Sometimes, Oso asks the audience to help him on his special assignments if it gets tricky and he needs some help. Oso tries to complete the Three Special Steps that Paw Pilot gives him. Then he earns a "Digi-Medal".
 Audience participation or interaction with Oso. Sometimes, Oso will ask the audience to help him find something hidden or missing on the screen. Other times, Oso will ask the audience to try something physically demanding that he is doing.

Three Healthy Steps
Special Agent Oso: Three Healthy Steps is a short series that airs in the United States during the Disney Junior programming block. It encourages children to use "three healthy steps" regarding eating, being healthy and exercising.

This series combined both animated characters and real life actors. The animated characters that are featured in the short series are Special Agent Oso, Paw Pilot, Special Agent Wolfie, Special Agent Dotty, and Professor Buffo.

Handy Manny crossover

In episode 32 of season 2, Oso meets Handy Manny and they work together to help a kid named David fix his bicycle.

Characters

Main

Guest voices

Madison Davenport as Stacy/Fiona
Grace Rolek as Molly/Sophie
Khamani Griffin as Danny/Aaron/Paulie 
Maria Celeste as Samantha
Kara R. Stribling as Abby/Jessica
Isabella Murad as Sally/Cassie/Michelle/Anna/Audrey 
Colin Ford as Joe/David
Sekai Murashige as Jack/Jennethan
Ciara Bravo as Sarah
Billy Unger as Michael/Quinn
Kurt Doss as Dawson/Austin/Logan
Kimberly Brooks as Grace
Kristen Combs as Caroline/Aaliyah/Avery
Quinton Lopez as Jim
Juliette Alba as Olivia
Jack Samson as Ben/Nathan
Harrison Fahn as Jake/Oliver/Anthony
Isabella Acres as Jade/Mia #1
Madison Pettis as Katie/Tara
John Devito as Sam/Theo
Fiona Riley as Addison/Maya
Church Lieu as Frank
Jillian Henry as Brianna
Stefanie Scott as Emma
Hynden Walch as Hailey
Nina Barry as Nicole
Jacob Bertrand as Spencer
Tiffany Espensen as Joon Kim/Carina
Élan Garfias as Cody/Grayson/Jose/Eric
Luke Manriquez as Carlos
Kwesi Boakye as Andrew
Diane HSU as Min/Meehwa
Firoozeh Adli as Makayla/Marie/Faith
Zachary Gordon as Tyler/Rasheed
Kailey Swanson as Ashley
Jelani Imani as William/Joshua/Dylan
Avion Baker as Natalie/Nadia/Charlotte 
Abby Weiss as Lisa
Nancy Kim as Jennifer
Luke Davis as Gavin
Zachary Michael as John
Brianna McCracken as Alexis
Cameron Escalante as Chloe
Sabre Jacobs as Kaylee
Parish Allen as Lizzie
Vanessa Millsaps as Lily
Coleen Crabtree as Leila
Raymond Ochoa as Noah
Ryan Christopher Lee as Noh Yoon/Nicholas/Liam/Charlie
Rico Rodriguez as Lin/Xavier/Marco/Brandon
Jacob Medrano as Alberto
Sayeed Shahidi as Evan
Liberty Smith as Madison/Lena 
Alec Gray as Dimitri
Caitlin Carmichael as Athena
Jet Jurgensmeyer as Rudy/Gabriel/Aiden
 Maxim Knight as David #2
Wilmer Valderrama as Handy Manny
Nika Futterman as Stretch & Squeeze
Carlos Alazraqui as Felipe
Dee Bradley Baker as Turner
Tom Kenny as Pat
Fred Stoller as Rusty
Kath Soucie as Dusty
Grey DeLisle as Flicker
Nancy Truman as Kelly
Erica Luttrell as Dylan and Sophie’s moms
Jennifer as Ashley #1
William Cwammendi as Wontwo

Additional voices
 Lou Holtz as Uncle Lou (character was modeled to look like himself)
 Rob Paulsen as Cassie's Dad/Dawson's Dad/Emma's Dad
 Colleen O'Shaughnessey as Jade's Mom/Jake's Mom/Nadia's Mom
 Sarah Chalke as David's Mom
Jeannie Elias as Michael's Mom/Quinn's Mom
 James Arnold Taylor as Mr. Thompson
 Mel Brooks as Grandpa Mel
 Malcolm-Jamal Warner as Brayden's Dad
 Kimberly Brooks as Andrew's Mom/Caroline's Mom

Broadcast
The first season of Special Agent Oso premiered in the United States and United Kingdom on April 4, 2009, and aired through April 17, 2010; the second and final season premiered on July 10, 2010 and the series finale aired May 17, 2012. In season 2, new characters were introduced, Professor Buffo and Special Agent Musa. The show has a crossover with Handy Manny called "The Manny with the Golden Bear".

References

External links
 
 Disney Channel press release for Special Agent Oso
 
 Special Agent Oso on TV.com
 Special Agent Oso on LOVEFILM
 

Disney Junior original programming
2009 American television series debuts
2012 American television series endings
2000s American animated television series
2010s American animated television series
Television series by Disney Television Animation
American preschool education television series
American computer-animated television series
American children's animated action television series
American children's animated adventure television series
American children's animated comedy television series
American children's animated fantasy television series
Animated preschool education television series
2000s preschool education television series
2010s preschool education television series
Animated television series about bears
Television series about wolves
Animated television series about foxes
English-language television shows